Anna Alexandrovna Savonina (born 5 December 2001) is a Russian ice hockey player and member of the Russian national ice hockey team, currently playing in the Zhenskaya Hockey League (ZhHL) with Tornado Moscow Region.

Savonina represented Russia at the 2019 IIHF Women's World Championship and represented the Russian Olympic Committee at the 2021 IIHF Women's World Championship.

References

External links
 

2001 births
Living people
People from Elektrostal
Russian women's ice hockey defencemen
HC Tornado players
Ice hockey players at the 2022 Winter Olympics
Olympic ice hockey players of Russia
Sportspeople from Moscow Oblast